The Owl Mountains are a mountain range of the Central Sudetes in southwestern Poland. It includes a protected area called Owl Mountains Landscape Park.

Geography

Apart from the main ridge, the subdivisions of Garb Dzikowca and Wzgórza Wyrębińskie can be distinguished.

The range is bounded by the valley of the Bystrzyca river in the northwest, forming a natural border with the adjacent Waldenburg Mountains (Góry Wałbrzyskie). In the southeast, the border is marked out by Srebrna Góra pass, separating them from the Bardzkie Mountains (Góry Bardzkie). In the north, the border is on Kotlina Distrabiekenstein and in the south on Obniżenie Noworudzkie and Włodzickie Hills. In the southwest, the broad Kłodzko Valley stretches to the Table Mountains (Góry Stołowe), the Stone Mountains (Góry Kamienne), and the border with the Czech Republic.

Seen from the Silesian Lowlands in the northeast, the Owl Mountains form a comparatively steep edge of the Central Sudetes, though the range is very diversified in terms of height.

The Precambrian gneiss rocks of the Owl Mountains constitute the oldest part of the Sudetes and are among the oldest in Europe. Other deposits include migmatite rocks, to a lesser extent also amphibolite, serpentinite, granulite, and pegmatite. Except for the summit clearings and the mountain passes, the Owl Mountains represent the spruce-clad type of mountains. There may be also observed a rare natural occurrence of beeches and European yew.

Project Riese

In World War II, a vast tunnel system was driven into the mountains near the village of Wüstewaltersdorf (present-day Walim) at the behest of the Nazi German government. Parts of the extended complex are accessible and can be visited as part of a guided tour.

Tourism
At the foot of the range are well-known tourist places, like: Rzeczka, Walim at the Wielka Sowa massif, Sokolec, Jugów, Sierpnica, and Zagórze Śląskie.

The mountains are covered by a network of tourist trails, including the "red trail", leading through most of Europe. Other destinations include: the Stone Tower on Wielka Sowa and the viewing tower on Kalenica, Fort Srebrna Góra, Grodno Castle in Zagórze Śląskie, the adit complexes of Project Riese near Walim and the Mining Museum in Poland. Major towns at the foot of the Owl Mountains include Bielawa, Dzierżoniów, Głuszyca, Jedlina-Zdrój, Nowa Ruda, Pieszyce, and Srebrna Góra.

See also
Eulengebirgsbahn

Sudetes
Mountain ranges of Poland